Rachid Hechiche is a French rugby league footballer who represented France at the 2000 World Cup.

Playing career
Hechiche played for the Lyon Villeurbanne club in the local French Rugby League Championship. He made his international debut for France in the 2000 World Cup, playing in four matches. In 2001 he was part of the French tour of New Zealand and Papua New Guinea. He last played for France in 2003.

References

Living people
French rugby league players
France national rugby league team players
1973 births
Lyon Villeurbanne XIII players
Rugby league props
Place of birth missing (living people)